Sarah E. Romans FRANZCP is a New Zealand academic psychiatrist and Emerita Professor at the University of Otago.

Academic career 
Romans holds a Bachelor of Medicine and Bachelor of Surgery and Doctor of Medicine from the University of Otago. She moved to the University of Toronto where she researched gender differences and depression. She returned to the University of Otago and was appointed a full professor, effective 1 February 2011. As of 2020 she is Professor Emerita at the University of Otago and also conducts a private psychiatric practice for adults.

Selected works

References

External links 

 

Living people
Year of birth missing (living people)
New Zealand psychiatrists
New Zealand women academics
Academic staff of the University of Otago